Parmotrema hypoleucinum is a species of foliose lichen in the family Parmeliaceae. A study of Parmotrema hypoleucinum in Tunisia revealed that it contains atranorin and (+)-iso-usnic acid, chemical compounds of interest for their anti-inflammatory activity. The species was originally scientifically described by Austrian lichenologist Julius Steiner in 1918 as a member of genus Parmelia. Mason Hale transferred it to Parmotrema in 1974.

See also
List of Parmotrema species

References

hypoleucinum
Lichen species
Lichens of North Africa
Lichens described in 1918